Muhammad Mosharraf Hossain (died on 18 August 2014) was a Bangladesh Nationalist Party politician and a Jatiya Sangsad member from Feni-3 constituency in the 1991, 2001, and 2008 elections.

Career
Hossain served as the Minister of Chittagong Hill Tracts Affairs, Minister of Information, and Minister of Labour. He served as the President of Bangladesh Association of International Recruiting Agencies.

Death
Hossain died on 18 August 2014 in United Hospital, Dhaka at the age of 75. He was buried in Banani Graveyard.

References

2014 deaths
Bangladesh Nationalist Party politicians
7th Jatiya Sangsad members
8th Jatiya Sangsad members
9th Jatiya Sangsad members
State Ministers of Chittagong Hill Tracts Affairs
Burials at Banani Graveyard
Year of birth missing
Place of birth missing
People from Fulgazi Upazila